Ragnvald Olsen (27 August 1897 – 1 September 1948) was a Norwegian sport wrestler.

He was born in Kristiania and represented the club Fagforeningens IL. He competed at the 1924 Summer Olympics, when he placed tied fifth in Greco-Roman wrestling, the bantamweight class.

References

1897 births
1948 deaths
Sportspeople from Oslo
Olympic wrestlers of Norway
Wrestlers at the 1924 Summer Olympics
Norwegian male sport wrestlers